Shawn Singleton is a Canadian actor and musician. His television roles have included the series Lord Have Mercy!, The Line, Doomstown, Platinum and Instant Star, as well as guest appearances in Flashpoint and Da Kink in My Hair. He also had minor roles in the films Four Brothers and Get Rich or Die Tryin'.

Singleton was also a producer and DJ for the Canadian hip hop band Baby Blue Soundcrew.

Filmography

Film

Television

References

External links

Canadian male television actors
Canadian male film actors
Canadian male voice actors
Canadian hip hop DJs
Black Canadian male actors
Black Canadian musicians
Living people
Canadian DJs
Date of birth missing (living people)
Place of birth missing (living people)
Canadian people of Barbadian descent
Year of birth missing (living people)